A number of Roman hoards have been discovered near Pewsey and Wilcot in the Vale of Pewsey, Wiltshire, England.

2000

On 25 July 2000,  John and David Philpott discovered a hoard of 1,166 coins (mostly silver siliquae) near Wilcot. The Stanchester Hoard, as it is now known, is in the Wiltshire Museum.

April 2014
From January to April 2014, Nick Barrett discovered 42 clipped silver siliquae. The find has been designated by the Portable Antiquities Scheme as WILT-B53A45.

May 2014
In May 2014, Russell Garman discovered a coin hoard of 2,384 coins, mostly nummi. It has been designated by the Portable Antiquities Scheme as BERK-637CB6.

October 2014
On 26 October 2014, Rob Abbot, Dave Allen, and Mick Rae discovered a hoard of eight Roman copper-alloy vessels packed inside an iron-rimmed cauldron. This has been designated by the Portable Antiquities Scheme as WILT-0F898C. The vessels are now in the Salisbury Museum.

2017
A hoard consisting of a bowl strainer, two basins and a bowl was found at Wilcot in 2017. It has been designated by the Portable Antiquities Scheme as WILT-047110.

2020
On 12 and 13 September 2020, Rob Abbot, Dave Allen and Mick Rae (who had made a discovery in 2014) found a total of 160 silver (and one copper) coins: 23 miliarenses and 137 siliquae, from Constans to Honorius. It was  designated by the Portable Antiquities Scheme as BM-7D34D9. Two of the coins went to the British Museum, and most of the rest were auctioned by Noonans Mayfair: they were expected to fetch £40,000 but ended up making £81,160.

See also
 List of Roman hoards in Great Britain

References

Treasure troves in England
Treasure troves of Roman Britain
Archaeological sites in Wiltshire
Hoards from Roman Britain
Coin hoards